Gilbert Eugène Ducournau (born 25 September 1992 in Caracas) is a Venezuelan–French cyclist riding for .

References

1992 births
Living people
French male cyclists
Venezuelan male cyclists